Yang Yang (meaning: "little sea") (b. 9 September 1997) is a male giant panda currently in captivity at Zoo Atlanta. He is the mate to Lun Lun and the father to Mei Lan, Xi Lan, Po, twins Mei Lun and Mei Huan and female twins, Ya Lun and Xi Lun.

Yang Yang was born at the Chengdu Research Base of Giant Panda Breeding and has been on loan to Zoo Atlanta since November 1999. He was originally named Jiu Jiu, until his "adoption" by three organizations in the Netherlands. Because giant pandas are solitary and males do not play any part in cub-rearing, Yang Yang is kept separate from Lun Lun and their offspring.

See also
Yang Yang (disambiguation)
Funny Stories With Pandas

References

Individual giant pandas
1997 animal births